Francesco Curatoli (born 22 January 1946) is an Italian former footballer who played as a midfielder.

Career 
Curatoli played in the Serie C in 1965 with U.S. Salernitana 1919. In 1967, he played in Serie B with A.C. Monza, and the following season he signed with S.S.C. Bari. In 1969, he played in the Serie A when Bari secured promotion to the top flight. He returned to Serie C to play with A.S.D. HSL Derthona in 1970, and the next season he played with U.S. Savoia 1908. In 1973, he played in the National Soccer League with Montreal Cantalia.

References  

Living people
1946 births
Association football midfielders
Italian footballers
Italian expatriate footballers
U.S. Salernitana 1919 players
A.C. Monza players
S.S.C. Bari players
U.S. Savoia 1908 players
Serie A players
Serie B players
Serie C players
Canadian National Soccer League players
Footballers from Naples
Italian expatriate sportspeople in Canada
Expatriate soccer players in Canada